Star Gala may refer to

Compilation albums
Star Gala Connie Francis 1998
Star Gala Roger Whittaker 1996
Star Gala Die Paldauer 1998
Star Gala Brunner & Brunner 1996
Star Gala Hanne Haller 1998
Star Gala (Baccara album)
Star Gala France Gall
Star Gala Frank Zander 1998
Star Gala Hans Hartz
Star Gala Freddy Quinn
Star Gala Udo Lindenberg
Star Gala Barry Ryan
Star Gala Demis Roussos